Sapthamashree Thaskaraha ( Seven Good Thieves) is a 2014 Malayalam-language heist comedy film directed and written by Anil Radhakrishnan Menon. The film features an ensemble cast of Prithviraj Sukumaran, Asif Ali, Nedumudi Venu, Sudheer Karamana, Chemban Vinod Jose, Neeraj Madhav, Salam Bukhari, Reenu Mathews, Sanusha, Joy Mathew and Mongolian artist Flower Battsetseg. The film is produced by Prithviraj, Santosh Sivan and Shaji Nadesan under August Cinema.  Sapthamashree Thaskaraha has cinematography by Jayesh Nair and music composed by Rex Vijayan. The film released on 6 September 2014 to positive reviews It led in the box office collections among the Onam releases and was deemed a blockbuster.

Plot 
The film is set in Thrissur and starts off with  Martin, a famous thief in Koorkancheri, confessing to a priest in a church, explaining his past. Martin gets arrested for stealing from a Hindu temple, while his accomplice Geevarghese escapes. He is sent to Central Prison Viyyoor near Viyyoor and meets 6 other people who had been arrested in: Narayankutty, an electronic shop owner arrested for giving a hidden camera in a soap box to 2 people, who used them in a hotel bathroom; Nobelettan, a rich, humble and famous businessman, Who is the founder and managing director of a chit fund company, cheated by Pius Matthew, a local politician and councillor, and his younger brother, Christo, which cost his son's life; Shabbab who beats up his visa provider who had busted him in a jail at Dubai for 10 months; Vasu aka Leaf Vasu, the former hitman of Pius, after a crowbar fell on his head he suffered a mental disorder; Salam, a circus magician, arrested for beating up some irritating audience; and Krishnanunni, a bank employee, whose wife Sarah was killed in a car accident after she was harassed and body shamed by Pius, who had abused her after she got cheated. After they were released, the seven of them planned to steal money from a safe in the charity hospital where Pius and his brothers had kept their money.
 
After they were released, they sought the help of Annamma, Nobelettan's daughter and a nurse at Pius' hospital, for installing spy cameras which was made by Narayankutty there. After finding the exact location of the safe, Krishnanunni found out that the safe can be only unlocked with 3 keys through the safe blueprint, each of them with Pius, Christo and Franko. For that, the gang planned of making a duplicate of those 3 keys by imprinting the keys onto a soap piece. They found out that Christo had kept his key in a glass cabinet, Pius carried the key on a chain, and Franko had it in his car.

After successfully distracting them and getting the key imprints, Krishnanunni planned to do the heist during a festival. That night, he told Leaf Vasu to put fireworks in the sewage tank of the charity hospital, which gave them access to the back of the hospital. He told Annamma to cut off the main supply so that they could get access to the room where the safe is, through the exhaust fan. After successfully getting to the room, they unlocked the safe. What they didn't know was the safe was connected to an alarm, which alerted the three of them. They chased the sewage trucks where they had put the money, but failing. The gang meet up on the side of the road, but Krishnanunni is missing. It is revealed that Krishnanunni had went off with the money.

The story comes back to the present, where Martin was explaining his story to the priest. He explained that the gang had searched for Krishnanunni, but they were surprised to see another person with the same name. After some days, each of them from the gang got a box with solar panels on the top. When they opened it, they found the money given as a share by Krishnanunni for the heist, later crying in joy. Then it is revealed that the Krishnanunni who helped them in the heist was actually a businessman. Then he was shown working on a business dealing solar panels (based on the solar scam happened in Kerala at the time).

Cast 

 Prithviraj Sukumaran as Krishnanunni / Unnamed businessman
 Asif Ali as Shabab
 Nedumudi Venu as Nobelettan
 Sudheer Karamana as Leaf Vasu
 Chemban Vinod Jose as Martin
 Neeraj Madhav as Narayankutty
 Salam Bukhari as Salam
 Sanusha as Annamma
 Joy Mathew as Pious Mathew
 Mukundhan as Franco Mathew
 Irshad as Christo Mathew
 Anu Joseph as Nicey Mathew
 Reenu Mathews as Sarah
 Lijo Jose Pellissery as The Priest sitting for Confession
 Shivaji Guruvayoor as Xavier
 Hareesh Perumanna as thief 2
 Pradeep as thief 1
 Sudhi Koppa as Geevarghese
 Rema Devi as Sarah's mother
 Indrajith Sukumaran as the real Krishnanunni (Cameo appearance)
 Veena as Chinnamma
 Shobha Singh as Rosey
 Gokulan as Locksmith
 Lishoy as Superintendent
 Vijayan Peringod as Vydhyarettan
 Amith Chakalakkal as Nobel's son
 Sudharaman as Christo's helper
 Francis as Franko's Helper
 Raj Kalesh as Circus Announcer
 Eswar Iyer as Sarah's father
 Ranjitha as office lady
 Thanseer as sexton
 Balan Thrissur as Security officer
 Anil as Babu
 Ambili as Babu's wife
 Nimisha Thilakan as Channel reporter
 Rebecca Santhosh (uncredited role)

Production
Nyla Usha was earlier roped in to play the female lead but due to certain date issues, she was replaced by Reenu Mathews, who was reported to "shed her simple housewife image" in this film. Anil had reworked on the script, due to which Sreenath Bhasi was replaced by Neeraj Madhav. A Mongolian circus artiste, Flower Battsetseg, was signed to play a pivotal role in the film. Sanusha stated that she played a nurse called Annamma in the film, which she was a bold and mature role, for which she would be sporting a no makeup look.

Music
The songs of the film was composed by Rex Vijayan and the film score was composed by Sushin Shyam.

Critical reception
The Times of India gave a rating of 7.5/10, and stated "This is one film that is not going to disappoint for there is an energy that is infectious."

References

External links
 

2014 films
Films shot in Thrissur
2010s Malayalam-language films